Salikhovo (Sälix) is a rural locality (a village) in Turumbetovsky Selsoviet, Aurgazinsky District, Bashkortostan, Russia. The population was 44 as of 2010. There is 1 street.

Geography 
Salikhovo is located 31 km west of Tolbazy (the district's administrative centre) by road. Turumbet is the nearest rural locality.

References 

Rural localities in Aurgazinsky District